Melanobatrachus is a genus of narrow-mouthed frogs in the family Microhylidae. It is the only remaining genus in the monotypic subfamily Melanobatrachinae. It contains a single species, Melanobatrachus indicus, also known as the Indian black microhylid frog and Malabar black narrow-mouthed frog. It is endemic to wet evergreen forests of southern Western Ghats in Kerala and Tamil Nadu states of India. It has been recorded from Anaimalai, Munnar, Palni hills, Periyar Tiger Reserve and Kalakkad Mundanthurai Tiger Reserve

Melanobatrachus indicus is a rare species that was only rediscovered in 1997. It lives amongst leaf-litter, rocks and other ground cover of moist evergreen tropical forests.

The subfamily Melanobatrachinae included two African genera, Hoplophryne Barbour & Loveridge, 1928 and Parhoplophryne Barbour & Loveridge, 1928, in the past but they are now placed in the subfamily Hoplophryninae.

Melanobatrachus indicus is an Evolutionarily Distinct and Globally Endangered (EDGE) species. It is classified as Vulnerable by the International Union for Conservation of Nature.

References

Further reading
 Biju, S.D. 2001. A synopsis to the frog fauna of the Western Ghats, India. Occasional Publication 1. ISCB. 1-24.
 Daltry, J.C. and Martin, G. 1997. Rediscovery of the black narrow-mouth frog Melanobatrachus indicus Beddome, 1878. Hamadryad 22(1):57-58.
 Dutta, S.K. 1997. Amphibians of India and Sri Lanka. Odyssey Publishing House. Bhubaneswar.
 Ishwar, N.M. 2000. Melanobatrachus indicus Beddome, 1878, resighted at the Anaimalai Hills, southern India. Hamadryad 25:50-51.
 Vasudevan, K. 1997. Rediscovery of the black microhylid Melanobatrachus indicus (Beddome, 1878). Journal of the Bombay Natural History Society 94:170-171.
 Vasudevan, K. 2000. An amazing frog from the Western Ghats. Biodiversity India 8-12:12.
 Nixon A M A and Bhupathy, S. 2007 Occurrence of Melanobatrachus indicus beddome 1878 in Mathikettan shola, Western Ghats. Journal of the Bombay Natural History Society 104:(1),105-6.

External links
 Global Amphibian Assessment

Monotypic amphibian genera
Microhylidae
Amphibian subfamilies
Frogs of India
Endemic fauna of the Western Ghats
Taxa named by Richard Henry Beddome
Taxa named by Gladwyn Kingsley Noble
EDGE species